Stenocereus alamosensis (octopus cactus or cina) is a species of cactus native to Mexico.  It is viviparous (that is, the seeds germinate before leaving the parent plant), apparently an adaptation to living in coastal plains which are prone to flooding. The Seri people of Sonora call this cactus xasaacoj. The specific epithet, refers to the plant's occurrence at Álamos in the Mexican state of Sonora, in northwestern Mexico.

References

External links 

Alamosensis
North American desert flora
Flora of Arizona
Flora of Mexico
Plants described in 1896